= The Lemonade War =

2007 novel by Jacqueline Davies

The Lemonade War is a children's novel written by American author Jacqueline Davies, published in 2007. It is the first of the Lemonade War series.

== Plot ==
The book begins with Evan in his parents' basement, avoiding his younger sister, Jessie. It is revealed he is annoyed about a letter notifying their mother that Jessie is skipping third grade to be in Evan's fourth grade class. Jessie is excited about moving up, but Evan is irritated because his sister is good at math and is worried she might embarrass him. As payback, he makes a lemonade stand with his friend Scott, rudely rebuffing Jessie. In retaliation, Jessie sets up her own lemonade stand, and gets a friend, Megan, to help out. The two siblings concoct a plan to earn $100, and whoever has the more successful lemonade stand gets the loser's earnings. Jessie uses her math and business skills to set goals (such as creating a franchise scheme with many girls selling lemonade for her) and Evan utilizes his skills at talking to people. The five-day war takes a disastrous turn when Jessie mixes dead fruit flies in Evan's lemonade, leading to his sales tanking. Evan steals Jessie's earnings in revenge, but then loses the money while he attends a friend's pool party. The two siblings reconcile by expressing regret for their actions towards each other.

== Reception ==
According to Kirkus Reviews, the book's events were simple to comprehend for its target readers. The book presented the feelings and intentions of the characters clearly, but could have benefited from adding more nuance to their personalities. Other reviews praised the book's humorous approach to teaching lessons about economics, while noting that the plot was still driven by Jessie and Evan's sibling rivalry.
